Pyramid puzzle may refer to:

Mathematics
 Cannonball problem, a mathematical problem
 Tower of Hanoi, a mathematical game

Other
 Pyramid puzzle, a type of mechanical puzzle